Taltemsen (Berber : ⵜⴰⵍⵜⵎⵙⵏ taltmsn) is a small Berber village located in the region of Souss-Massa in Morocco. According to the 2004 census, it has about 55 inhabitants.

References 

Populated places in Chtouka Aït Baha Province
Mountain villages in Morocco